Antonia Eugenia Vardalos (born September 24, 1962) is a Canadian actress, director, producer and screenwriter. She is best known for starring in and writing the romantic comedy film My Big Fat Greek Wedding (2002), which garnered her nominations for the Academy Award for Best Original Screenplay, and the Golden Globe Award for Best Actress – Motion Picture Comedy or Musical.

Early life
Vardalos was born in Winnipeg, Manitoba, on September 24, 1962. She is the daughter of Greek Canadian parents Doreen Christakos, a bookkeeper and homemaker, and Constantine "Gus" Vardalos, a land developer who was born in Kalavryta, Greece. She attended St. George School and Shaftesbury High School in Winnipeg and Ryerson University in Toronto.

Career

An alumna of the Chicago-based Second City comedy repertory company, Vardalos wrote and performed in over ten revues of sketch comedy and won Chicago's Joseph Jefferson award for Best Actress. Vardalos had many small roles in television shows such as The Drew Carey Show and Two Guys and a Girl; in addition, she provided voices for the 1996 radio adaptation of Star Wars: Return of the Jedi which Brian Daley had written for National Public Radio. 

She gained fame with her movie about a woman's struggle to find love in My Big Fat Greek Wedding. The film was a critical and commercial success. The film earned Vardalos an Academy Award Nomination for Best Writing, a Golden Globe Nomination for Best Actress in a Motion Picture Musical or Comedy and a Screen Actors Guild Award Nomination.

The sleeper hit quickly became one of the highest-grossing independent films of all time, and the number one romantic comedy of all time. Vardalos hosted Saturday Night Live in the fall of 2002.

The next film she starred in, which she also wrote, and in which she also sang and danced, was Connie and Carla, released in 2004; this became a cult-hit musical, and is about two women pretending to be drag queens. (The plot has been compared to that of Some Like It Hot, the 1959 American romantic comedy film which Billy Wilder directed, produced, and co-wrote, which had starred Marilyn Monroe, Tony Curtis, and Jack Lemmon, in that as with the two male leads of Some Like It Hot, the female leads of Connie And Carla did what they did to hide from criminals whose crimes they had witnessed and who could still kill both of them had they been found.)

Vardalos made her directorial debut in 2009 with the independent feature I Hate Valentine's Day. The film, about a florist finding romance, was made for less than $400,000 and on only a limited release grossed $1,985,260 at the international box-office. This was followed by My Life in Ruins, about a misguided tour-guide traveling around Greece and featuring Academy Award winner Richard Dreyfuss. The film was the first American production given permission to film at the Acropolis; Vardalos personally sought the approval from the Greek government and credits her years of Greek School for helping her be fluent in the language. 

In 2011, Vardalos collaborated with Tom Hanks to write the romantic comedy film Larry Crowne for the screen. The film was a commercial success, grossing $59.8 million; Vardalos also voiced the character Map Genie in the film. 

In 2016, Vardalos adapted Cheryl Strayed's beloved book, Tiny Beautiful Things, and starred in the sold out run of the play at The Public Theater in New York, directed by Thomas Kail. The play received outstanding reviews and is the New York Times Critic's Pick. Vardalos reprised her role in 2017 in another sold-out run at The Public, and again at the Pasadena Playhouse in California. Published by Samuel French, the play was quickly licensed by many theaters and is on the list of Top Ten Most Produced Plays.

Vardalos joined many celebrities helping to produce The 1 Second Film art project; she herself was featured in The Dialogue, an interview series. In this 90 minute interview with producer Mike DeLuca, Vardalos talked about how her experiences in The Second City comedy troupe helped her as an actress and a screenwriter, and how the unofficial "tell-the-Greek" word-of-mouth program had a hand in catapulting her movie to such great heights. She sang The Beatles song "Golden Slumbers" on the 2006 charity album Unexpected Dreams – Songs from the Stars.

Vardalos starred in and wrote My Big Fat Greek Wedding 2, which was released in March 2016. It earned over $60 million domestically from an $18 million budget and much more internationally and in home box office sales. 

From 2015 to 2017, Vardalos and Gomez co-presented the first two seasons of The Great American Baking Show, formerly known as The Great Holiday Baking Show, for ABC-TV. 

In 2018, Vardalos guest-starred in an episode of The CW series Crazy Ex-Girlfriend.

In 2019, Vardalos played Faye Anderson in the ABC television holiday film Same Time, Next Christmas. In 2020, in what was, for her, a rare turn to both serious, non-comedy acting and impostures of real people, she impersonated convicted poisoner Stacey Castor in the made-for-television movie Poisoned Love: The Stacey Castor Story, which Lifetime Television transmitted.

In September 2022, Vardalos, along with comedian Rob Riggle, created, wrote, and starred in the 10 episode comedy podcast Motivated! for Audible Original and Broadway Video.

She is scheduled to reprise her role as Toula Portakalos in My Big Fat Greek Wedding 3 in which she will serve as director and screenwriter.

Personal life
In September 1993, Vardalos married American actor Ian Gomez. After trying for nine years to conceive through IVF and surrogacy, Vardalos and Gomez adopted their daughter, Ilaria, in 2008. At the time Ilaria was three years old and part of the foster care system. In 2013, Vardalos wrote a book about the experience, a New York Times bestseller she titled Instant Mom, and she donates all the proceeds from its royalties to adoption groups. Vardalos also posted an advice column about the adoption process in The Huffington Post.

On July 3, 2018, it was announced that Vardalos had filed for divorce from Gomez after 23 years of marriage, and that they had already been separated since June of 2017. The divorce was finalized two months later.

Filmography

Film

Television

References

External links

Nia Vardalos's Executive Producer Profile on The 1 Second Film website

1962 births
Living people
20th-century American actresses
20th-century Canadian actresses
21st-century American actresses
21st-century Canadian actresses
Actresses from Winnipeg
American film actresses
American writers of Greek descent
American television actresses
American voice actresses
Canadian emigrants to the United States
Canadian film actresses
Canadian people of Greek descent
Canadian television actresses
Canadian voice actresses
Eastern Orthodox Christians from Canada
Greek Orthodox Christians from the United States
Toronto Metropolitan University alumni
Writers from Winnipeg
American women screenwriters
Canadian women screenwriters
Independent Spirit Award winners
People with acquired American citizenship
Canadian Comedy Award winners